Broughton Vale is a locality in the City of Shoalhaven in New South Wales, Australia. It lies north of the Princes Highway at Berry between Nowra and Gerringong and on Broughton Mill creek. Broughton Vale is to not to be confused with Broughton Village or Broughton, which both lie to its immediate east.

References

City of Shoalhaven
Localities in New South Wales